Saphenista chiriboga is a species of moth of the family Tortricidae. It is found in Pichincha Province, Ecuador.

The wingspan is about 24 mm. The ground colour of the forewings is cream, suffused and sprinkled with yellowish brown. There are a few brown dots along the costa and some brown scales in rows between the median veins and some at the tornus. The hindwings are cream, tinged with ochreous brownish.

Etymology
The species name refers to Chiriboga, the type locality.

References

Moths described in 2008
Saphenista